The following is a list of Georgian wine appellations. 20 appellations are registered with Sakpatenti, Georgia's national intellectual property center. 18 are described in a book published in 2010, and the 19th and 20th were announced in 2018 and 2019

References 

Appellations
Wine appellations
Appellations
Wine